Spice Girls Ltd v Aprilia World Service BV [2002] EWCA Civ 15 is the leading English contract law case concerning misrepresentation by conduct.

Geri Halliwell's departure from British girl group the Spice Girls on 27 May 1998 was the subject of a lawsuit by Aprilia World Service B.V. (AWS), a manufacturer of motorcycles and scooters. On 9 March 1998, Halliwell informed the other members of the Spice Girls of her intention to withdraw from the group, yet the group signed an agreement with AWS on 24 March and again on 30 April, and participated in a commercial photo shoot on 4 May in Milan, eventually concluding a contract with AWS on 6 May 1998. The Court of Appeal of England and Wales held that their conduct constituted a misrepresentation by giving the impression that Halliwell intended to remain part of the group in the foreseeable future, allowing AWS to rescind their contract with the Spice Girls.

See also

References

English misrepresentation case law
2002 in British law
Court of Appeal (England and Wales) cases
2002 in case law